Dehabad or Dahabad may refer to:
 Dehabad, Ardestan
 Dehabad, Natanz